Calle Facius (born 1 January 1971) is a Danish former professional footballer who made 300 appearances in the Superliga for AaB, Ikast FS and Vejle Boldklub.

References

1971 births
Living people
Danish men's footballers
Danish Superliga players
Association football midfielders
AaB Fodbold players
Vejle Boldklub players
FC Midtjylland players